Arístides Victoria Yeb (born 18 June 1966) is a politician from the Dominican Republic.

Early life, family and education
Victoria Yeb was born to Lourdes Yeb Raposo, of Lebanese and Portuguese ancestry, and Arístides Victoria José, Vice Minister of Labor of the Dominican Republic, of French and Lebanese descent.

He graduated with a BA in Law at the Pedro Henríquez Ureña National University.

Political career
Victoria was elected Senator for the Province of María Trinidad Sánchez in 2010, for a six-years-term. Previously, he was governor of María Trinidad Sánchez from August 2006 to August 2010, and Vice Minister of Interior and Police from August 2004 to August 2006.

He was described as one of the most hardworking senators.

Victoria Yeb was succeeded in the senatorship by Alexis Victoria Yeb, his political rival and double cousin.

References 

Living people
1966 births
People from Nagua
Dominican Liberation Party politicians
Members of the Senate of the Dominican Republic
Dominican Republic people of French descent
Dominican Republic people of Lebanese descent
Dominican Republic people of Portuguese descent
White Dominicans